Gold Mountain and similar may refer to

Gold Mountain (toponym), a calque nickname referring to a settlement with a surge of Chinese population caused by a gold rush
Gold Mountain (Washington), a mountain in Kitsap County, Washington
Gold Mountain, California, a community in California
Gold Mountain Range, a mountain range in Nevada
Gold Mountain Records, a record label
New Gold Mountain, a calque nickname for Australia or Melbourne

See also
 
Kingsoft, a Chinese software company whose Chinese name means "Gold Mountain"
金山 (disambiguation), Chinese source for the calque